The Journal of Narrative Theory is a triannual peer-reviewed academic journal covering narratology in literary fiction. The journal was established in 1971 as the Journal of Narrative Technique and obtained its current title in 1999. It is published by the Department of English at Eastern Michigan University and the editors-in-chief are Abby Coykendall and Andrea Kaston Tange. In An Introduction to Narratology, Monika Fludernik lists it as one of "the most important journals in the field".

References

External links 

English-language journals
Literary magazines published in the United States
Publications established in 1971
Eastern Michigan University
Narratology
Triannual journals
1971 establishments in Michigan